Fields of Fire is a novel by U.S. Senator Jim Webb, first published in 1978.  It follows the lives of several Marines serving in the Vietnam War.

Content 
The novel is told mainly from the viewpoints of three Marines: 2nd Lt Robert E. Lee Hodges, who comes from a long line of soldiers; "Snake" (no full name given), a squad leader in Hodges' platoon, a tough kid from the streets; and "Senator" (Will Goodrich), an impressionable and sensitive Harvard student who volunteers for service. The major themes are centered on loyalty, leadership, and the brutalizing effects on people in a time of war.
Written only three years after the last American troops withdrew from Vietnam, and despite being written by a man who loved the military and hated the antiwar movement, Fields of Fire points out the flawed logic of the Vietnam War through its hero, Lieutenant Hodges.

Reception

References

1978 American novels
Military fiction
Novels set during the Vietnam War
Novels about the United States Marine Corps
Prentice Hall books